iFit or Ifit may refer to 

iFit proteins
 Ifit, the name for Intsia bijuga in the Mariana Islands